"I'll Kill You" is the debut single by Japanese heavy metal band X Japan, then named X, released in June 1985.

Overview
In 1988, Yoshiki explained that the song is not about killing people as the title would suggest, but is a love song in the vein of a disgruntled married couple. All 1,000 copies of the record sold out. The cover art notoriously features numerous photographs of dead bodies taken during the Vietnam War.

A different recording of the B-side, "Break the Darkness", was included on the sampler Heavy Metal Force III in November 1985. While a re-recording of the title track was later featured on the band's first album, Vanishing Vision. "I'll Kill You" was covered by French symphonic black metal band Anorexia Nervosa as a bonus track for the Japanese edition of their 2004 album Redemption Process and later included on their 2005 The September E.P. as well.

Track listing

Personnel

X
 Toshimitsu "Toshi" Deyama – vocals
 Yoshiki Hayashi – drums
 Atsushi Tokuo  – bass guitar
 Yuji "Terry" Izumisawa – guitar
 Tomoyuki "Tomo" Ogata – guitar

Production staff
 Photo – Kazuyoshi Mori
 Design – Atsushi Tokuo
 Engineer – Mr. Ohzeki
 Sleeve Design – Nobukatsu Hayashi

References

X Japan songs
Songs written by Yoshiki (musician)
English-language Japanese songs
1985 debut singles
1985 songs